Diorama is a municipality in eastern Goiás state, Brazil.

Location and Connections
Diorama is 254 kilometers west of the state capital, Goiânia, and is 30 kilometers west of the regional center, Iporá.  Neighboring municipalities are Montes Claros de Goiás, Arenópolis, Iporá, and Israelândia.

Highway connections from Goiânia are made by GO-060 / Trindade / Nazário / São Luís de Montes Belos / Israelândia / Iporá / GO-174.

The economy
The economy is based on agriculture, livestock raising, and wood processing.  In 2007 there were 2 small transformation industries and 24 commercial units.  There were 59,000 head of cattle.  Agricultural production was modest with small areas of rice, bananas, beans, sugarcane, corn and soybeans.

Agricultural data 2006
Number of farms:  391
Total area:  48,159 ha.
Area of permanent crops: 30 ha. (bananas)
Area of perennial crops: 557 ha. (soybeans, corn, rice)
Area of natural pasture:  36,229 ha. 
Area of woodland and forests:  10,988 ha.
Cattle herd: 59,000
Number of workers: 730
Number of farms with tractors: 58
Number of tractors:  70    IBGE

Education and health
Literacy rate: 83.5%
Infant mortality rate: 21.93 in 1,000 live births
Schools: 05 (2006) with 695 students
Hospitals: 01 with 26 beds (2007)
Municipal Human Development Index:  0.733
State ranking:  135 (out of 242 municipalities in 2000)
National ranking:  2,363 (out of 5,507 municipalities in 2000)

History
Settlement began in 1946 on lands belonging to the municipality of Iporá.  A local rancher, Edmundo Benuto Dias donated land for a new settlement, which was called "Aropi", the inversion of the name "Iporá".  In 1954 it was elevated to the category of district with the new name of  Mendelândia, after Antônio Mendes, one of the pioneers of the region.  In 1955 the name was changed to Diorama, of unknown origin.  In 1958 it became a municipality.

See also
 List of municipalities in Goiás

References

Frigoletto

Municipalities in Goiás